Bill.com Holdings, Inc. is a company based in San Jose, California, that provides automated, cloud-based software for financial operations. A white-labeled, end-to-end payments automation platform, Bill.com Connect is offered to financial institutions as part of their single sign-on online business banking ecosystem.

History 
René Lacerte, who co-founded and led an online payroll software startup PayCycle, stepped down as its CEO in November 2004 per the decision of the Board. Lacerte soon started working on his next company which eventually became Bill.com. Founded in April 2006 as Cashboard, Inc., the company enables small businesses to pay their bills and keep their books in the cloud. Its early investors included August Capital and DCM Ventures.

In October 2019, Bill.com started offering new capabilities to help mid-market companies automate their AP/AR functions.

Bill.com completed its initial public offering (IPO) on the New York Stock Exchange in December 2019. In early 2020, Bill.com moved its headquarters from Palo Alto to San Jose, California.

In June 2021, Bill.com completed the acquisition of Divvy for $2.5 billion, an expense management company that modernizes finances for businesses by combining software and smart corporate cards into a single platform. Later that September, the company closed the acquisition of Invoice2go for $625 million, an AR mobile-first company, extending the company's reach to serve sole proprietors.

References

External links

 

2006 establishments in California
Companies based in San Jose, California
Companies listed on the New York Stock Exchange
American companies established in 2006
Financial services companies established in 2006
Online financial services companies of the United States
Electronic funds transfer
Payment service providers
2019 initial public offerings